Govert boyen (born 7 March 1977 in Sint-Truiden) is a Belgian football goalkeeper who is currently unemployed. He was last on the books of Veldwezelt.

Previously, he played for Antwerp in the Belgian Pro League and spent most of his career with Lommel United and OH Leuven in the Belgian Second Division.

References

1977 births
Living people
Belgian footballers
Belgian Pro League players
Challenger Pro League players
Royal Antwerp F.C. players
Lommel S.K. players
Oud-Heverlee Leuven players
FC Dordrecht players
Eerste Divisie players
Association football goalkeepers
People from Sint-Truiden
Footballers from Limburg (Belgium)